Saint Lucia competed in the Olympic Games for the first time at the 1996 Summer Olympics in Atlanta, United States.

History 
Throughout the 17th and 18th centuries control of Saint Lucia passed back and forth between France and the United Kingdom. After the fourteenth change in possession in 1814, Saint Lucia remained in control of the United Kingdom until it became an independent country in 1979.

Athletics

Men

Field

Women

Key
Note–Ranks given for track events are within the athlete's heat only
Q = Qualified for the next round
q = Qualified for the next round as a fastest loser or, in field events, by position without achieving the qualifying target
NR = National record
N/A = Round not applicable for the event
Bye = Athlete not required to compete in round

Sailing

Mixed

References

Official Olympic Reports

Nations at the 1996 Summer Olympics
1996
Oly